{{Speciesbox
| image = 
| status = LC
| status_system = IUCN3.1
| status_ref = <ref name="iucn status 11 November 2021">{{cite iucn |authors= Muñoz, A., Aparicio, J., Embert, D., Aguayo, R., Gonzales, L. & Colli, G.R. |date=2019 |title='Tropidurus chromatops |volume=2019|page= e.T178351A56257328|url=https://www.iucnredlist.org/species/178351/56257328 |access-date=16 December 2021}}</ref> 
| genus = Tropidurus
| species = chromatops
| authority = Harvey & Gutberlet, 1998
}}Tropidurus chromatops'' is a species of lizard of the Tropiduridae family. It is found in Bolivia and Brazil.

References

Tropidurus
Reptiles described in 1998
Reptiles of Bolivia
Reptiles of Brazil